This is a list of German language place names in Poland, now exonyms for towns and villages in the Masuria Region of the Warmian-Masurian Voivodeship.

Barciany Barten
Bartoszyce Bartenstein
Dąbrówno Gilgenburg
Działdowo Soldau
Ełk Lyck
Giżycko Lötzen
Gołdap Goldap
Górowo Iławeckie Landsberg
Grzybowo Grzybowen
Iława Deutsch Eylau
Kętrzyn Rastenburg
Lyna Lahna
Miłakowo Liebstadt
Miłomłyn Liebemühl
Morąg Mohrungen
Mrągowo Sensburg
Nidzica Neidenburg
Olecko Marggrabowa, 1928 Treuburg
Olsztynek Hohenstein
Orzysz Arys
Ostróda Osterode
Pasłęk Preussisch Holland
Pisz Johannisburg
Ryn Rhein
Szczytno Ortelsburg
Szkotowo Skottau
Węgorzewo Angerburg
Zalewo Saalfeld

See also 
List of German exonyms for places in Poland

 GM
Masuria